Fusceulima jacksonensis is a species of sea snail, a marine gastropod mollusk in the family Eulimidae.

Distribution
 Marine

References

 Warén, A. (1984). A generic revision of the family Eulimidae (Gastropoda, Prosobranchia). Journal of Molluscan Studies. suppl 13: 1-96

External links
 To World Register of Marine Species
 Laseron C.F. (1955). Revision of the New South Wales eulimoid shells. The Australian Zoologist. 12(2): 83-107, 3 pls
 de Souza L.S. & Pimenta A.D. (2014). Fusceulima and Halielloides (Gastropoda: Eulimidae) in the southwestern Atlantic, with descriptions of two new species of Fusceulima. Zoologia. 31(6): 621-633

Eulimidae
Gastropods described in 1955